Svetlana Vladimirovna Bogdanova (born July 12, 1964) is a Russian former handball player who competed for the Unified Team in the 1992 Summer Olympics.

In 1992 she won the bronze medal with the Unified Team. She played all five matches as goalkeeper.

External links
profile

1964 births
Living people
Sportspeople from Yekaterinburg
Soviet female handball players
Russian female handball players
Olympic handball players of the Unified Team
Handball players at the 1992 Summer Olympics
Olympic bronze medalists for the Unified Team
Olympic medalists in handball
Medalists at the 1992 Summer Olympics
Expatriate handball players
Russian expatriate sportspeople in Spain